Intertemporal law (tempus regit actum) is a concept in the field of legal theory.

It deals with the complications caused by alleged abuse or violation of collective or individual rights in the historical past in a territory in which the legal system has undergone significant changes since then, and a redress along the lines of the current legal regime is virtually impossible.

The origins of intertemporal law, as a legal theoretical concept, especially in relation to the use of force but also for the delimitation of States' boundaries, are to be found in C.J. Max Huber's discussion in the Palmas Arbitration case. (Islands of Palmas Arbitration, Netherlands v US, 1928) in which he stated that:"a juridical fact must be appreciated in the light of the law contemporary with it, and not of the law in force at the time such a dispute in regard to it arises or falls to be settled"while balancing it however by stating that:"The same principle which subjects the act creative of a right to the law in force at the time the right arises, demands that the existence of the right, in other words its continued manifestation, shall follow the conditions required by the evolution of the law."The Island of Palmas (archived from the original on 2008-05-28), Scott, Hague Court Reports 2d 83 (1932) (Perm. Ct. 4rb. 1928), Abridgement and notes by Kurt Taylor Gaubatz.This creates a tension whereas a "first branch demands that the legality of an act be judged by the law in force at the time the act occurs; the second that we take into account any change in the law over time."

Intertemporal law can be more broadly defined as the branch of law which governs the usage of treaties, codifications and legal acts to the cases that occurred before their creation or entry into force. It existed in Roman law, which caused the phrase lex retro non agit (a law does not work backward) to be coined. The principle is currently applied in several branches of law, sometimes with modifications, such as the Polish Criminal Code in which the principle lex severior retro non agit (a stricter law does not work backward) is used.

See also
Alaska Native Claims Settlement Act
Native title
Reparations Agreement between Israel and West Germany
Reparations for slavery
Island of Palmas Case

Restitution
International law

References